Frederick Pirani (3 December 1858 – 26 October 1926) was a New Zealand politician. He was Member of the House of Representatives for Palmerston from 1893 to 1902, first as a Liberal, then as an Independent.  He was part of the Liberal Party's "left" (radical) wing.

Early life
Pirani was born in Melbourne, Australia, and his family emigrated to New Zealand in 1864. His father was a journalist, and later owner of the Manawatu Evening Standard.  Pirani served his apprenticeship as a printer under John Ballance on the Wanganui Herald in the late 1870s, and later became a journalist.

Political career

In 1884 he moved to Palmerston North, where he became involved in politics. He was elected as councillor of Palmerston North Borough in 1888–1889, and again in 1901.

He established a local chapter of the Knights of Labour, and in 1890 stood for Parliament as a Labour candidate, losing by only 61 votes. He was persuaded to stand again by John Ballance, and was elected as a Liberal in 1893. He would hold the seat until 1902, but the change in the Liberal platform under Richard Seddon led him to gradually break with the party.

In 1896 he was associated with the Radical Party, and stood as an "independent liberal". In 1898 he voted against the government on a confidence motion, effectively becoming part of the opposition. He was re-elected as an independent in 1899.

Pirani died in Wellington on 26 October 1926.

References

Further reading

 Symondson, B. Frederick Pirani, MHR Palmerston North, 1893-1902: a study of his political career. MA thesis, Massey, 1977

1858 births
1926 deaths
New Zealand Liberal Party MPs
Independent MPs of New Zealand
Australian emigrants to New Zealand
Palmerston North City Councillors
Unsuccessful candidates in the 1902 New Zealand general election
Unsuccessful candidates in the 1905 New Zealand general election
Unsuccessful candidates in the 1914 New Zealand general election
Unsuccessful candidates in the 1919 New Zealand general election
Unsuccessful candidates in the 1890 New Zealand general election
Members of the New Zealand House of Representatives
New Zealand MPs for North Island electorates
People from Melbourne
19th-century New Zealand politicians